Solar  may refer to:

Astronomy 
 Of or relating to the Sun
 Solar telescope, a special purpose telescope used to observe the Sun
 A device that utilizes solar energy (e.g. "solar panels")
 Solar calendar, a calendar whose dates indicate the position of the Earth on its revolution around the Sun
 Solar Maximum Mission, a satellite
 SOLAR (ISS), an observatory on  International Space Station

Music 
 "Solar" (composition), attributed to Miles Davis
 Solar (Red Garland album), 1962
 Solar (Taeyang album), 2010
 Solar, a 2011 album by Rubik
 "Solar", a song by Northlane from Mesmer, 2017
 SOLAR Records, a record label

Geography 
 Solar (Spanish term), a type of urban site
 Solar, County Antrim, Northern Ireland, United Kingdom
 Solar, Erode, India
 Solar, Iran, Iran

Companies 
 Solar Entertainment Corporation, a Philippines television and radio media company
 Solar TV, a former TV channel
 Solar Television Network, Inc., a former name of the media company Nine Media Corporation
 Solar News Channel, a defunct television news channel in the Philippines (terrestrial)
 Solar Turbines, a gas turbine company

People
 Solar (name), list of people with the name
 Solar (singer) (born 1991), leader and main vocalist of Korean girl group Mamamoo

Technology 

 Solar energy or solar power
 Solar panel
 USS Solar (DE-221), a ship
 Wright Solar, a bus body

Other uses 
 Solar (comics), an American fictional comic book character
 Solar (novel), by Ian McEwan
 Solar (room), a place in many medieval homes
 Solar 2, a 2011 video game
 Solar, a variant of diesel fuel sold in Indonesia

See also 
 Apache Solr
 Sol (disambiguation)
 Solaar
 SOLAR (disambiguation)
 Solar One (disambiguation)
 Soler (disambiguation)
 Solari (disambiguation)
 Solaris (disambiguation)
 Solarisation (disambiguation)
 Solarius (disambiguation)